Saint-Égrève is a commune in the Isère department in southeastern France. It is part of the Grenoble urban unit (agglomeration).

Population

Twin towns - sister cities
Saint-Égrève is twinned with:
 Karben, Germany, since 1974
 Mińsk Mazowiecki, Poland, since 1991
 Krnov, Czech Republic, since 1991
 Telšiai, Lithuania

References

External links 
 

Communes of Isère
Isère communes articles needing translation from French Wikipedia